Márcio Wenceslau Ferreira (born March 20, 1980 in São Paulo) is a Brazilian taekwondo practitioner. He qualified for the men's flyweight category (58 kg) at the 2008 Summer Olympics in Beijing, when he won a silver medal for his host nation at the 2007 Pan American Games in Rio de Janeiro, losing out to Gabriel Mercedes of the Dominican Republic in the final match. He also added the bronze medal at the 2011 Pan American Games in Guadalajara, Mexico, after being defeated by Mexico's Damian Villa in the semi-final round. He is the brother of Marcel Ferreira, who also competed for the same category at the 2004 Summer Olympics in Athens.

At the 2008 Summer Olympics, Wenceslau defeated Iran's Reza Naderian by hitting a frontal blow in the first preliminary round match, with a score of 2–1. He reached the quarterfinal round, before losing to world champion Juan Antonio Ramos of Spain, by a defensive kick in the first two periods, with a decisive score of 2–3.

References

External links
Profile – UOL (2008 Olympic Games) 

NBC 2008 Olympics profile

Brazilian male taekwondo practitioners
1980 births
Living people
Olympic taekwondo practitioners of Brazil
Taekwondo practitioners at the 2008 Summer Olympics
Sportspeople from São Paulo
Pan American Games silver medalists for Brazil
Pan American Games bronze medalists for Brazil
Pan American Games medalists in taekwondo
Universiade medalists in taekwondo
South American Games silver medalists for Brazil
South American Games medalists in taekwondo
Taekwondo practitioners at the 2007 Pan American Games
Taekwondo practitioners at the 2011 Pan American Games
Competitors at the 2010 South American Games
Universiade bronze medalists for Brazil
World Taekwondo Championships medalists
Medalists at the 2007 Pan American Games
Medalists at the 2011 Pan American Games
21st-century Brazilian people
20th-century Brazilian people